James May (1877–unknown) was a Scottish footballer who played in the Football League for Preston North End.

References

1877 births
Date of death unknown
Scottish footballers
English Football League players
Association football forwards
St Mirren F.C. players
Preston North End F.C. players